Keshar or Kashar may refer to:
Keshar-e Bala, village in Hormozgan Province
Keshar-e Chemerdan, village in Hormozgan Province
Keshar-e Dustani, village in Hormozgan Province
Keshar-e Sargap, village in Hormozgan Province
Keshar-e Zir, village in Hormozgan Province
Keshar-e Olya, village in Tehran Province
Keshar-e Sofla, village in Tehran Province